Norfolk South was a federal electoral district represented in the House of Commons of Canada from 1867 to 1904. It was located in the province of Ontario. It was created by the British North America Act of 1867 which divided the county of Norfolk into two ridings. The South Riding consisted of the Townships of Charlotteville, Houghton, Walsingham, and Woodhouse and the Woodhouse Gore.

In 1882, the town of Simcoe and the village of Port Dover were added to the riding. In 1892, South Norfolk was defined as above, with the addition of the township of Walpole and the village of Port Rowan.

The electoral district was abolished in 1903 when it was redistributed between Haldimand and Norfolk ridings.

Electoral history

|- 
  
|Liberal
|Peter Lawson   
|align="right"|  1,050   
 
|Unknown
|N. O. Walker 
|align="right"|969   

|- 
  
|Conservative
|WALLACE, William   
|align="right"| 1,208    
 
|Unknown
|KILLMASTER, H.J.  
|align="right"|1,098

|}

|- 
  
|Liberal
|STUART, John  
|align="right"| 1,233   
 
|Unknown
|LAWSON, P.  
|align="right"| 1,140   
|}

|- 
  
|Conservative
|WALLACE, William   
|align="right"| 1,402    
 
|Unknown
|STUART, John  
|align="right"| 1,244   
|}

|- 
  
|Conservative
|WALLACE, William  
|align="right"| 1,327    
 
|Unknown
|ALLAN, H.W.   
|align="right"|1,310   
|}

|- 
  
|Liberal
|JACKSON, Joseph   
|align="right"| 1,560   
 
|Unknown
|WALLACE, William    
|align="right"|1,534   
|}

|- 
  
|Conservative
|TISDALE, David   
|align="right"| 1,797    
  
|Liberal
|JACKSON, Joseph  
|align="right"|1,736   
|}

|- 
  
|Conservative
|TISDALE, David       
|align="right"| 2,051    
  
|Liberal
|ELLIS, Jonathan   
|align="right"|1,639   
|}

|- 
  
|Conservative
|TISDALE, Hon. David    
|align="right"| 2,383    
 
|Patrons of Industry
|WALKER, George   
|align="right"| 2,110   
|}

|- 
  
|Conservative
|TISDALE, Hon. David    
|align="right"| 2,472    
  
|Liberal
|ATKINSON, Thos. R.  
|align="right"| 2,200   
|}

See also 

 List of Canadian federal electoral districts
 Historical federal electoral districts of Canada

References

External links 

 Website of the Parliament of Canada

Former federal electoral districts of Ontario
Norfolk County, Ontario